Yunist ShVSM Chernihiv is Ukrainian women's football club from Chernihiv, Ukraine established in 2020.

ShVSM abbreviation stands for School of Higher Sports Mastery (Ukrainian: Школа Вищої Спортивної Майстерності).

History

Origin
The team was found as a temporary solution in 2020 in Chernihiv as the Chernihiv Oblast was left without a women's team for the first time since 1992. The new club was formed based on a local sports school Yunist Chernihiv and a women's club Yednist-ShVSM Plysky and since 2020 is playing in the First League, the second tier (amateur level) of the woman football competitions in Ukraine. The club intends to join the FC Desna Chernihiv as its women's section for the 2021–22 season when all women's clubs will be merged with men's club.

Roots from Spartak Chernihiv
In 2021, the new club takes its roots from a women's football team Spartak ShVSM Chernihiv that first entered the 2015 First League competition and in 2016 received a promotion to the Ukrainian Women's League of the Ukrainian Top League for the season 2017. In 2017 the club was relocated to Plysky and was renamed as Yednist Plysky. In 2018 the Yednist Plysky was merged with Lehenda-ShVSM Chernihiv as Yednist-ShVSM Plysky. The Lehenda's chairman Volodymyr Maherramov became a chairman of Yednist-ShVSM. In June 2020 Yednist-ShVSM Plysky informed the Ukrainian Association of Football that it ends its participations in competitions.

Recently Time
Recently the team is playing in Ukrainian First league in the season 2021–22.

Stadium & Facilities
The Team plays in Yunist Stadium in Victory Ave, 110 Chernihiv, Ukraine.In 2017, work on the reconstruction of the new stadium began. For the reconstruction of the Yunist Stadium cost 55 million hryvnias in 2019.

Managers
Spartak Chernihiv (2015 – 2017)

Yednist-ShVSM Plysky (2017 – 2020)
 2018 Roman Zayev
 2019 Volodymyr Kulyk
 2019 Oleksandr Babor
 2020 Maksym Rakhayev
 2020–2021 Natalia Hryhorivna
 2022 Liudmyla Shmatko

See also
 Yunist Chernihiv
 FC Yednist' Plysky
 Lehenda Chernihiv
 FC Desna Chernihiv
 FC Desna-2 Chernihiv
 FC Desna-3 Chernihiv
 SDYuShOR Desna
 FC Chernihiv
 Spartak Chernihiv

External links
 unist.cn.ua (Sports school website)
 womensfootball.com.ua
 Yunist Chernihiv Instagram

References

FC Yunist Chernihiv
Football clubs in Chernihiv
Football clubs in Chernihiv Oblast
Women's football clubs in Ukraine
Ukrainian Women's League clubs
2020 establishments in Ukraine